Since 1980, the United Nations World Tourism Organization has celebrated World Tourism Day as international observances on September 27. This date was chosen as on that day in 1970, the Statutes of the UNWTO were adopted. The adoption of these Statutes is considered a milestone in global tourism. The purpose of this day is to raise awareness on the role of tourism within the international community and to demonstrate how it affects social, cultural, political and economic values worldwide. 

At its Twelfth Session in Istanbul, Turkey, in October 1997, the UNWTO General Assembly decided to designate a host country each year to act as the Organization's partner in the celebration of World Tourism Day. At its Fifteenth Session in Beijing, China, in October 2003, the Assembly decided the following geographic order to be followed for World Tourism Day celebrations: 2006 in Europe; 2007 in South Asia; 2008 in the Americas; 2009 in Africa and 2011 in the Middle East.

The late Ignatius Amaduwa Atigbi, a Nigerian national, was the one who proposed the idea of marking September 27 of every year as World Tourism Day. He was finally recognized for his contribution in 2009. The colour of World Tourism Day is Blue.

Host countries and themes of the World Tourism Day

References

External links
World Tourism Day
Krakow Guide Website
Sangam University Bhilwara Rajasthan - World Tourism Day 2012
 Tourism Day Facts

September observances
World Tourism Organization
Tourism Day, World